Brodhead is a city in Green and Rock counties in the U.S. state of Wisconsin. The population was 3,274 at the 2020 census. In February 2000, the city annexed a portion of land from the Town of Spring Valley in Rock County.

History
Just south of town is a historic marker for the Half-Way Tree, a bur oak supposedly identified by Native Americans as the halfway point on a foot trail between Lake Michigan and the Mississippi River.

The railroad track that runs east and west through town features a small museum with a train and army tank on display, adjacent to the park and bandstand pavilion. The museum curator said that the railroad was being wooed by two different towns and decided to split the difference and created Brodhead.

A nearby raceway was dredged off of a branch of the Sugar River that diverted a long canal to a  hydroelectric generator that supplied electricity to the town. This gave Brodhead the distinction of having electrical service before other larger cities such as Chicago, and perhaps the first electrical service in Wisconsin.

Geography
Brodhead is located at  (42.618540, -89.376291).

Demographics

As of 2000 the median income for a household in the city was $36,506, and the median income for a family was $46,199. Males had a median income of $32,031 versus $24,442 for females. The per capita income for the city was $17,455. About 6.6% of families and 7.3% of the population were below the poverty line, including 4.1% of those under age 18 and 5.8% of those age 65 or over.

2010 census
As of the census of 2010, there were 3,293 people, 1,346 households, and 851 families residing in the city. The racial makeup of the city was 96.4% White, 0.1% African American, 0.3% Native American, 0.5% Asian, 1.9% from other races, and 0.8% from two or more races. Hispanic or Latino people of any race were 3.8% of the population.

There were 1,346 households, of which 32.3% had children under the age of 18 living with them, 46.8% were married couples living together, 11.4% had a female householder with no husband present, 5.1% had a male householder with no wife present, and 36.8% were non-families. 31.1% of all households were made up of individuals, and 14% had someone living alone who was 65 years of age or older. The average household size was 2.41 and the average family size was 3.01.

The median age in the city was 38.4 years. 25% of residents were under the age of 18; 7.9% were between the ages of 18 and 24; 26.1% were from 25 to 44; 23.3% were from 45 to 64, and 17.6% were 65 years of age or older. The gender makeup of the city was 47.3% male and 52.7% female.

Education
Brodhead is served by the Brodhead School District. Grades Pre-K through 5 attend Albrecht Elementary school. Grades 6 through 8 attend Brodhead Middle School. Brodhead High School is the local high school.

Transportation

Wisconsin State Highways
 WIS 11 runs right through town as 1st Center Ave.
 WIS 81 runs south of town.
 WIS 104 starts at the northeast corner of town.

Railroads
The Wisconsin and Southern Railroad runs through town on the branch line to Monroe.

Notable people

Thax Douglas, poet; lives in Brodhead
David Dunwiddie, Wisconsin state legislator; lived in Brodhead
Milton S. Livingston, physicist; born in Brodhead
Harvey T. Moore, Vermont and Wisconsin state legislator; lived in Brodhead
Henry Putnam, Wisconsin state legislator; was President of Brodhead
Archibald N. Randall, Wisconsin state legislator
Burr Sprague, Wisconsin state legislator; lived in Brodhead
Albert M. Ten Eyck, academic
Fred Ties, Wisconsin state legislator; lived in Brodhead

Gallery

References

External links
 City of Brodhead
 Sanborn fire insurance maps: 1908 1915

Cities in Wisconsin
Cities in Green County, Wisconsin
Cities in Rock County, Wisconsin